The following is a list of public school districts in Connecticut.

Local

A

Amistad Academy District
Ansonia Public Schools 
Area Cooperative Educational
Ashford School District
Avon Public Schools

B

Berlin Public Schools 
Bethany School District
Bethel Public Schools 
Bloomfield Public Schools 
Bolton Public Schools 
Bozrah Public Schools 
Branford Public Schools 
Bridgeport Public Schools 
Bristol Public Schools 
Brookfield Public Schools 
Brooklyn Public Schools

C

Canterbury Public Schools 
Canton Public Schools 
Chaplin Elementary School
Cheshire Public Schools 
Clinton Public Schools 
Colchester Public Schools 
Columbia Public Schools 
Coventry Public Schools 
Cromwell Public Schools

D

Danielson Public Schools
Danielson Mills The School Danielson
Danbury Public Schools 
Darien Public Schools 
Derby Public Schools

E

East Granby Public Schools 
East Haddam Public Schools 
East Hampton Public Schools 
East Hartford Public Schools 
East Haven Public Schools 
East Lyme Public Schools 
East Windsor Public Schools 
Eastford Elementary School 
Ellington Public Schools 
Enfield Public Schools

F

Fairfield Public Schools 
Farmington Public Schools (Farmington, CT) 
Franklin Public Schools

G

Glastonbury Public Schools 
Granby Public Schools 
Greenwich Public Schools 
Griswold Public Schools 
Groton Public Schools 
Guilford Public Schools 
Green Hills Public Schools

H

Hamden Public Schools 
Hartford Public Schools 
Hartland School

K

Kent Center School
Killingly Public Schools

L

Lebanon Public Schools 
Ledyard Public Schools 
Lisbon Central School 
Litchfield Public Schools

M

Madison Public Schools 
Manchester Public Schools 
Mansfield Public Schools 
Marlborough Public School District 
Meriden Public Schools 
Middletown Public Schools 
Milford Public Schools 
Monroe Public Schools 
Montville Public Schools

N

Naugatuck Public Schools 
New Britain School District 
New Canaan Public Schools 
New Fairfield Public School District 
New Haven Public Schools 
New Killingly Public Schools
New London Public Schools 
New Milford Public Schools 
Newington Public Schools 
Newtown Public Schools 
Norfolk School District
North Branford Public Schools 
North Haven Public Schools 
North Stonington Public Schools 
Norwalk Public Schools 
Norwich Public Schools

O

Old Saybrook Public Schools 
Orange Elementary Schools
Oxford Public Schools

P

Plainfield Public Schools 
Plainville Community Schools 
Plymouth Public Schools 
Pomfret Community School 
Portland Public Schools 
Preston Public Schools 
Putnam Public Schools

R

Ridgefield Public Schools 
Rocky Hill Public Schools

S

Salem Public Schools 
Seymour Public Schools 
Shelton Public Schools 
Sherman School 
Simsbury Public Schools 
Somers Public Schools 
South Windsor Public Schools 
Southington Public Schools 
Sprague Public Schools 
Stafford Public Schools 
Stamford Public Schools 
Sterling Memorial School 
Stonington Public Schools 
Stratford Public Schools 
Suffield Public Schools

T

Thomaston Public Schools 
Thompson Public Schools 
Tolland Public Schools 
Torrington School District 
Trumbull Public Schools

U
Union Public Schools

V

Vernon Public Schools 
Voluntown Public Schools

W

Westford Schools 
Waterbury Public Schools 
Waterford Public Schools 
Watertown Public Schools 
West Hartford Public Schools 
West Haven Public Schools 
Westbrook Public Schools 
Weston Public Schools 
Westport Public Schools 
Wethersfield Public Schools 
Wilton Public Schools 
Winchester Public Schools 
Windham Public Schools 
Windsor Locks Public Schools 
Windsor Public Schools 
Wolcott Public Schools 
Woodstock Public Schools

Regional

Regional School District 1 (serving 9-12 in Canaan, Cornwall, Kent, North Canaan, Salisbury and Sharon)
Regional School District 4 (serving 7-12 in Chester, Deep River and Essex)
Regional School District 5 (serving 7-12 in Bethany, Orange and Woodbridge)
Regional School District 6 (serving Goshen, Morris and Warren)
Regional School District 7 (serving 7-12 in Barkhamsted, Colebrook, New Hartford and Norfolk)
Regional School District 8 (serving 7-12 in Andover, Hebron and Marlborough)
Regional School District 9 (serving 9-12 in Easton and Redding)
Regional School District 10 (serving Burlington and Harwinton)
Regional School District 11 (serving 9-12 in Chaplin, Hampton and Scotland)
Regional School District 12 (serving Bridgewater, Roxbury and Washington)
Regional School District 13 (serving Durham and Middlefield)
Regional School District 14 (serving Bethlehem and Woodbury)
Regional School District 15 (serving Middlebury and Southbury)
Regional School District 16 (serving Beacon Falls and Prospect)
Regional School District 17 (serving Haddam and Killingworth)
Regional School District 18 (serving Lyme and Old Lyme)
Regional School District 19 (serving 9-12 in Ashford, Mansfield and Willington)

External links
List of Connecticut school districts with websites from the Connecticut State Department of Education
Lists of Connecticut schools and districts by county from SchoolTree.org.

School districts
Connecticut
School districts